Agapornithinae is a subfamily of psittacine birds, one of the five subfamilies that make up the family Psittaculidae. Its members are small, short-tailed parrots that inhabit Africa and Asia. They usually have predominantly green plumage and present different colorations on the head.

Genera
The subfamily contains 3 genera:

 Genus Agapornis
 Agapornis canus – grey-headed lovebird
 Agapornis fischeri – Fischer's lovebird
 Agapornis lilianae – Lilian's lovebird
 Agapornis nigrigenis – black-cheeked lovebird
 Agapornis personatus – yellow-collared lovebird
 Agapornis pullarius – red-headed lovebird
 Agapornis roseicollis – rosy-faced lovebird
 Agapornis swindernianus – black-collared lovebird
 Agapornis taranta – black-winged lovebird
 Genus Bolbopsittacus
 Bolbopsittacus lunulatus – guaiabero
 Genus Loriculus
 Loriculus amabilis – Moluccan hanging parrot
 Loriculus aurantiifrons – orange-fronted hanging parrot
 Loriculus beryllinus – Sri Lanka hanging parrot
 Loriculus camiguinensis – Camiguin hanging parrot (sometimes considered a subgenus of L. philippensis)
 Loriculus catamene – Sangihe hanging parrot
 Loriculus exilis – pygmy hanging parrot or green hanging parrot
 Loriculus flosculus – Wallace's hanging parrot
 Loriculus galgulus – blue-crowned hanging parrot
 Loriculus philippensis – Philippine hanging parrot or Colasisi
 Loriculus bonapartei – black-billed hanging parrot
 Loriculus pusillus – yellow-throated hanging parrot
 Loriculus sclateri – Sula hanging parrot
 Loriculus stigmatus – great hanging parrot or Celebes hanging parrot
 Loriculus tener – Bismarck hanging parrot or green-fronted hanging parrot
 Loriculus vernalis – vernal hanging parrot

References 

 
Psittaculidae